Teuira Henry (24/27 January 1847 – 23 January 1915) was a British Tahitian scholar, ethnologist, folklorist, linguist, historian and educator. She worked to reconstruct a lost manuscript on the history of Tahiti written by her grandfather, English missionary John Muggridge Orsmond, by using his original notes. Most of her writings were published posthumously by the Bernice Pauahi Bishop Museum as the book Ancient Tahiti.

Early years and education 
Henry was born on 24 January or 27 January 1847, on Tahiti, as the fourth child and eldest daughter of Isaac S. Henry and Eliza Orsmond Henry. Her paternal grandparents were William Henry and Sarah Maebens Henry while her maternal grandparents were John Muggridge Orsmond and Isabella Nelson Orsmond. Her two grandfathers were early English Protestant missionaries to Tahiti. William Henry had been part of the first contingent of the London Missionary Society to arrive on the ship Duff in 1797.

Raised on Tahiti, she was educated at the missionary school run by William Howe and his wife in Papeete. She became fluent in French, English and Tahitian.

Career
Becoming a school teacher, she taught French and English at the Viennot School in Papeete for twenty years. From 1890 to 1906, Henry also taught in the Royal School and Kaahumanu School in Honolulu, Hawaii.

Henry's maternal grandfather Orsmond had collected significant amounts of oral histories, genealogy, myths, folklore and traditional knowledge such as astronomy and navigation while living in Tahiti between 1817 and his death in 1856. In 1848, he had presented a manuscript about the history of Tahiti to French colonial official Charles François Lavaud, but it was lost before it could be published in Paris.
During her lifetime, Henry reconstructed this lost manuscript by transcribing the original notes he left behind.
Henry collected further similar material, translated and notated the material and wrote articles that were published by journals such as the Journal of the Polynesian Society.

Henry died on 23 January 1915, in Paea, Papeete, Tahiti, at the age of 67 years old.

Her manuscript was posthumously published as Ancient Tahiti by the Bernice Pauahi Bishop Museum in 1928.
Bertrand Jaunez translated it into French in 1951 under the title Tahiti aux temps anciens.
In 1995, Dennis Kawaharada re-printed some of Henry's stories alongside others in Voyaging chiefs of Havaiʻi.

References 

1847 births
1915 deaths
People from Papeete
People from Tahiti
Tahitian women
People from Honolulu
Women ethnologists
French Polynesian writers
French Polynesian women writers
French Polynesian ethnologists
French Polynesian educators
French Polynesian historians
French Polynesian folklorists
French Polynesian people of English descent
Women historians
Women folklorists